Loncopan Airport ,  is an airstrip  west-northwest of Futrono, a lakeside town on Ranco Lake in the Los Ríos Region of Chile. The runway parallels the highway just south of the village of Nontuela.

See also

Transport in Chile
List of airports in Chile

References

External links
OpenStreetMap - Loncopan
OurAirports - Loncopan
FallingRain - Loncopan Airport

Airports in Chile
Airports in Los Ríos Region